John Rolfe (1585–1622) was an English settler of Virginia and husband of Pocahontas.

John Rolfe may also refer to:

John Carew Rolfe (1859–1943), American classicist
John Rolfe (actor) (1935–2020), British actor
John Rolfe (sport shooter)

See also
John Rolph (disambiguation)